Alaa Abdul-Zahra Khashen Al-Azzawi (born 22 December 1987 in Baghdad, Iraq), is an Iraqi football player who currently plays for Al-Shorta in the Iraqi Premier League. He is also a member of Iraq national team. He can be deployed as an attacking midfielder or a second striker, and since 2016 plays a striker. He is the third-most capped player in the history of the Iraq national team.

Club career

Early life
Affectionately nicknamed 'the Kaká of Iraq' Alaa's road towards fame looked relatively straightforward. At the age of 16, he got his playing career off to a dream start when he was discovered and signed by Iraqi powerhouses Al-Zawraa.

Al-Zawraa
In 2004 at the age of 16, Alaa Abdul-Zahra made a move to Al-Zawraa. He was part of Al-Zawraa's squad for the AFC Champions League in 2005 with the number 29 shirt. A year later he won with them the Iraq Super League in 2006.

Mes Kerman
After the AFC Youth Championship 2006, Alaa Abdul-Zahra signed a one-year contract with the newly promoted Iranian Premier League club Mes Kerman. He played 11 times for them and scoring 4 goals, as the team finished in 7th place, before moving to play in Jordan.

Shabab Al-Ordon
Alaa Abdul-Zahra signed with Duhok FC Before the start of Iraq Super League (2007-2008) but he didn't go to Iraq, Instead he signed another contract with the Jordanian club Shabab Al-Ordon, and claimed that signing with Duhok FC was incomplete.

On 29 December 2007 in his first appearance with Shabab Al-Ordon, Alaa Abdul-Zahra scored his first goal with his new team against Hussein Irbid in Jordan Cup, helped his team to win 3–2 and qualify to the quarterfinals, then on 3 Jan 2008 Alaa Abdul-Zahra played his 2nd and last match with Shabab Al-Ordon this season against Al-Arabi Irbid in Jordan League, which they won 2–3.

Al-Merrikh
Alaa Abdul-Zahra and his Olympic team's mate Saad Attiya signed a Contract with Sudan giant club Al-Merrikh. He won Sudan Premier League and Sudan Cup 2008, and scored 9 goals.

Time in Qatar
After the success in the Sudanese League, Alaa signed a contract with the Qatari side Al-Khor. which he played with 14 league matches scoring eight goals.
After the great months he spent in Al-Khor Alaa moved to another Qatari club this time with Al Kharaitiyat. Scoring 16 goals in 42 occasions, the club finished 8th in the league that season.

In June 2011, Alaa signed a one-year deal with Qatar side Al-Wakrah. playing 10 times and scoring 3 goals, the team finished 7th in the league.

In June 2012, Alaa signed a Half Season with Qatar side Qatar SC. and scored 2 goals.

Duhok
Before the start of the 2012-13 season, Abdul-Zahra signed with Duhok FC and made a total of 47 appearances in the 2012–13 Iraqi Premier League and 2013–14 scoring 31 goals.

Tractor Sazi
On 20 July 2014, Abdul-Zahra joined Tractor Sazi with signing a one-season contract with the club. He played his first match for Tractor Sazi on 8 August 2014 against Zob Ahan. after a Less than two months with Tabrizi side, decided leave Tractor Sazi. After pressure from the national team coach to leave the club, And his desire to play the striker instead of the midfielder. He officially released on 10 September 2014.

Al-Shorta
Alaa Abdul-Zahra signed with Al-Shorta in September 2014. and scored 8 goals. the club finished 3rd in the league that season.

Return to Al-Zawraa
Alaa Abdul-Zahra returned to Al-Zawraa in July 2015. he became instrumental to the team as Al Zawraa went on to win the Iraqi League 2015–16. The team also finished second in the Iraq FA Cup, after a 2–0 loss to Al Quwa Al Jawiya. The following season, Ala'a finished as the top goal scorer of the Iraqi league for the first time in his career with 23 goals, however Al Zawraa failed to retain the title and finished in a disappointing 4th place. The team reached the final of the Iraqi FA cup once again, where he scored the winner in the 94th minute to win the championship.

Second stint at Al-Shorta
On 13 September 2017, Abdul-Zahra signing a one-season contract with Al-Shorta. He scored many goals continuously after sacked Brazilian coach Marcos Paquetá in 27 March 2018. He finished his season with Al Shorta with 22 goals (5pen) in 37 matches in the league. The team finished in 4th position.

International career
He first made his mark on the international scene with Iraq's youth team at the 2004 AFC Youth Championship in Malaysia. Two years later, he would repeat this feat by figuring prominently at the 2006 AFC Youth Championship, where the striking prodigy finished as the tournament's second-top scorer with four goals despite his team's early exit at the quarter-final stage. From there, he went on to showcase his predatory talents in Asia's qualifying final round for the Olympic Football Tournament Beijing 2008 by topping the scoring charts with a six-goal haul.

At senior level, he featured in two of Iraq's eight qualifying matches for the 2010 FIFA World Cup at South Africa, coming off bench to play in a goalless draw against Pakistan before featuring in the 2–0 loss to Qatar.

Alaa played for the Iraq national team from June 2007 to January 2018, scoring 15 goals. In October 2019, he was called up by Iraq team for games against Hong Kong and Cambodia.

International goals
As of 29 May 2021

Style of play
Abdul-Zahra, a playmaker and offensive play, and is often involved in passing moves which lead to goals, through their vision, technique, ball control, creativity, and passing ability. and More recently play striker.

Honours

Club
Al-Zawraa
Iraqi Premier League: 2005–06, 2015–16
Iraq FA Cup: 2016–17
Al-Merreikh
Sudan Premier League: 2008
Sudan Cup: 2008
Al-Shorta
Iraqi Premier League: 2018–19, 2021–22
Iraqi Super Cup: 2019, 2022

International
 2012 Arab Nations Cup: Bronze Medal
 21st Arabian Gulf Cup: Runner-up
 Asian Games
 2006: Runners-up

Individual
 2016–17 Iraqi Premier League: Top scorer (23 goals)
 2018–19 Iraqi Premier League: Top scorer (28 goals)
 2008 Summer Olympics qualification (AFC): Top scorer 
 20th Arabian Gulf Cup: joint top scorer (3 goals)

See also
 List of footballers with 100 or more caps

References

External links
 
 
 

1987 births
Living people
Iraqi footballers
Iraq international footballers
2009 FIFA Confederations Cup players
2011 AFC Asian Cup players
2015 AFC Asian Cup players
Iraqi expatriate footballers
Sportspeople from Baghdad
Sanat Mes Kerman F.C. players
Expatriate footballers in Iran
Expatriate footballers in Jordan
Expatriate footballers in Sudan
Expatriate footballers in Qatar
Association football forwards
Al-Zawraa SC players
Al Kharaitiyat SC players
Qatar SC players
Al-Wakrah SC players
Al-Khor SC players
Qatar Stars League players
Al-Merrikh SC players
Asian Games medalists in football
Footballers at the 2006 Asian Games
Al-Shorta SC players
FIFA Century Club
Asian Games silver medalists for Iraq
Medalists at the 2006 Asian Games